It's About Time is the fourth solo album to date by R&B singer Morris Day.  Released 12 years after his previous album Guaranteed, It's About Time is somewhat a return to form for Day.  With the exception of four new songs, the album consists of previous hits, recorded live with the modern line-up of The Time.  The live material was poorly edited to remove curse words and to fade abruptly between songs, removing most of the audience reactions. The patchiness of the album was not received well. He would release his final album titled The Call on November 11th, 2022

Track listing
 "The Bird"  – 4:13 composed by Jamie Starr/Morris Day/Jesse Johnson
 "Jungle Love"  – 2:57 composed by Jamie Starr/Morris Day/Jesse Johnson
 "Gigolos Get Lonely Too"  – 4:17 composed by Jamie Starr
 "Cool"  – 6:20 composed by Jamie Starr/Dez Dickerson
 "Ice Cream Castles"  – 4:59 composed by Jamie Starr/Morris Day
 "Get It Up / 777"  – 5:23 composed by Jamie Starr
 "Girl"  – 2:46 composed by Jamie Starr
 "Fishnet"  – 2:46 composed by Morris Day/Jimmy Jam and Terry Lewis
 "Ain't a Damn Thing Changed"  – 2:49 composed by Morris Day/The Whole 9
 "In My Ride"  – 4:16 composed by Morris Day/The Whole9
 "Two Drink Minimum"  – 3:49 composed by Morris Day/The Whole 9/Tonya White
 "Last Night"  – 3:57 composed by Morris Day/The Whole 9/Tonya White

Personnel
Mastering – Stephen Marcussen
Mixing – Peter Mokran
Producer – Morris Day, The Whole 9, Ontario Haynes, John Rhone, Brian Hood, Jesse Johnson, Jamie Starr
 Rap – E-40
 Management- Courtney Benson

The Time
Bass – Ricky "Freeze" Smith
Drums – Jellybean Johnson
Guitar – Torrell "Tori" Ruffin
Keyboards – Monte Moir, Stanley "Chance" Howard, Robert "Gi" Grisset
Percussion and valet – Jerome Benton
Vocals – Morris Day (lead), the band (backing)

References

Morris Day albums
2004 albums
Hollywood Records albums